The Florida Sire Stakes Desert Vixen division is a thoroughbred horse race run annually at Gulfstream Park, in Hallandale Beach, Florida for two-year-old, fillies by FTBOA registered stallions at a distance of six furlongs on dirt. It is part of the eleven-race Florida Thoroughbred Breeders' & Owners' Association (FTBOA) Florida Sire series of which seven races are hosted by Gulfstream Park and four by Tampa Bay Downs.

History
Inaugurated at Calder Race Course in 1982, the race was part of Calder's Florida Stallion Stakes series through 2013 after which Calder's racing operations were leased to the Stronach Group, operators of Gulfstream Park.

Named in honor of U.S. Racing Hall of Fame inductee Desert Vixen, it is the first and shortest of the three Gulfstream Park FBTOA races exclusively for this specific age and gender group of registered Florida-breds who are from a Florida Sire Stakes eligible stallion. Run between the beginning of August and the end of September, the Desert Vixen Stakes precedes the Susan's Girl Stakes at 7 furlongs and the My Dear Girl Stakes at  1 1/16 miles (8.5 furlongs).

Records
Speed record at Gulfstream Park:
 At 6 furlongs : 1:11.08 by Go Astray in 2017

Speed record at Calder:
 At 6 furlongs : 1:11.26 by Valid Forbes in 2000

Most wins by a jockey:
 4 – José A. Vélez Jr. (1983, 1984, 1988, 1990)

Most wins by a trainer:
 3 – Emanuel Tortora (1989, 1996, 2009)
 3 – Stanley I. Gold (2010, 2011, 2014)

Most wins by an owner:
 2 – Jacks or Better Farm, Inc. (2010, 2011, 2014)

Winners
Gulfstream Park 2017–2018 Media Guide and race history:

References

Restricted stakes races in the United States
Gulfstream Park
Calder Race Course
Horse races in Florida
Flat horse races for two-year-old fillies
Recurring sporting events established in 1982
1972 establishments in Florida